() is a Berlin U-Bahn station located in the  district. Since 12 December 2004 it is served by the  line.

History
The station was designed by Alfred Grenander, and was placed in service on 22 December 1929 as the centre of the modernist  housing estate, built between 1926 and 1932 by architects Bruno Taut, Hugo Häring, and others. Two strip malls and a small cinema were added in 1932.

The area was named after Uncle Tom's Cabin, the 1852 anti-slavery novel by Harriet Beecher Stowe.  In 1885 a local landlord named Thomas opened a public house at the southern rim of the  forest and installed several small huts in his beer garden to shelter his guests from the rain. These huts were referred to as "Tom's Cabins", which reminded many of the famous book. Over the years the estate, the station, the cinema and the  took on the name as well. The pub was demolished in 1979.

In popular culture 
 station is the location of some key scenes in the 2017 Amazon Video TV series You Are Wanted.

References

External links

U3 (Berlin U-Bahn) stations
Buildings and structures in Steglitz-Zehlendorf
Railway stations in Germany opened in 1929